The 1878 New Brunswick general election was held in June 1878, to elect 41 members to the Post-Confederation 24th New Brunswick Legislative Assembly, the governing house of the province of New Brunswick, Canada. The election was held before the adoption of party labels. John James Fraser was appointed premier of New Brunswick on May 4, 1878, following the resignation of George Edwin King, and led his government into the election weeks later. 

Of forty-one MLAs (members of the Legislative Assembly), thirty-one were in support of the government, and ten formed the opposition.

Results

References

1878 elections in Canada
Elections in New Brunswick
1878 in New Brunswick
June 1878 events